La Villa de los Santos also known La Heroica Villa de Los Santos, is the capital city and a corregimiento of the Los Santos District of Los Santos Province, Panama. It is at the left edge of La Villa River. Founded as Santa Cruz in 1555 by Juan Rodriguez Monjaraz, the then governor of the region, the city is known for The Gesture of Rufina Alfaro and the population's efforts in the movement to separate Panama from Spanish power in November 1821.

A yearly festival is hosted to celebrate the anniversary of the beginning of Panama's war for independence, which started in La Villa de los Santos.  José Higinio Durán, the Catholic bishop of Panama, and Julián Chávez, the mayor of the city, were two individuals who called for Panama's independence.  According to local tradition, a woman born to slave parents named Rufina Alfaro participated in the occupation of Spanish military outposts in the town, although this is disputed.

It was created by Law 5 of January 19, 1998.  Though it is a corregimiento, it is properly called Villa de los Santos rather than Corregimiento de Los Santos. Its population as of 1990 was 6,543; its population as of 2000 was 7,194.

See also 
Anita Moreno Regional Hospital

References

Further reading

Corregimientos of Los Santos Province
Populated places in Los Santos Province
Populated places established in 1555
1555 establishments in the Spanish Empire